Four Dutch ships of the Admiralty of Amsterdam (one of five regional navies within the United Provinces of the Netherlands) have borne the name Batavier or Batavia, named after the ancient Germanic tribe of the Batavi, who inhabited the region of Batavia around Nijmegen:
 The 24-gun frigate  built at Amsterdam in 1692 and burnt by the French after being stranded on a sandbank in August 1695
 The 52-gun ship of the line  built at Amsterdam in 1699, which was broken up in 1725
 The 64-gun ship of the line  built at Amsterdam, in 1746, which was broken up in 1778
 The 50-gun ship of the line  built at Amsterdam in 1779, which in 1795 was taken over by the Batavian Republic and in 1799 was captured by and incorporated into the British Navy

Naval ship names of the Netherlands